The 1896 United States presidential election in Massachusetts took place on November 3, 1896, as part of the 1896 United States presidential election. Voters chose 15 representatives, or electors to the Electoral College, who voted for president and vice president.

Massachusetts overwhelmingly voted for the Republican nominee, former governor of Ohio William McKinley, over the Democratic nominee, former U.S. Representative from Nebraska William Jennings Bryan. McKinley won Massachusetts by a margin of 43.15%.

McKinley was able to win every county in the state of Massachusetts, including a rare Republican victory in Suffolk County, home to the state's capital and largest city, Boston. Bryan, running on a platform of free silver, appealed strongly to Western miners and farmers in the 1896 election, but had little appeal in the Northeastern states such as Massachusetts. Bryan would win Suffolk County during his rematch with McKinley in 1900 but would lose it again to William Howard Taft in 1908.

With 69.47% of the popular vote, Massachusetts would be McKinley's second strongest victory in terms of percentage in the popular vote after neighboring Vermont.

This was the last occasion until 1984 that a Republican won the town of Blackstone in a presidential election.

Results

See also
 United States presidential elections in Massachusetts

References

Massachusetts
1896
1896 Massachusetts elections